Megastylis is a genus of flowering plants from the orchid family, Orchidaceae. It contains 6 known species, all native to Vanuatu and New Caledonia.

Megastylis gigas (Rchb.f.) Schltr.
Megastylis latilabris (Schltr.) Schltr.
Megastylis latissima (Schltr.) Schltr.
Megastylis montana (Schltr.) Schltr.
Megastylis paradoxa (Kraenzl.) N.Hallé
Megastylis rara (Schltr.) Schltr.

See also 
 List of Orchidaceae genera

References 

 Pridgeon, A.M., Cribb, P.J., Chase, M.A. & Rasmussen, F. eds. (1999). Genera Orchidacearum 1. Oxford Univ. Press.
 Pridgeon, A.M., Cribb, P.J., Chase, M.A. & Rasmussen, F. eds. (2001). Genera Orchidacearum 2. Oxford Univ. Press.
 Pridgeon, A.M., Cribb, P.J., Chase, M.A. & Rasmussen, F. eds. (2003). Genera Orchidacearum 3. Oxford Univ. Press
 Berg Pana, H. 2005. Handbuch der Orchideen-Namen. Dictionary of Orchid Names. Dizionario dei nomi delle orchidee. Ulmer, Stuttgart

Diurideae genera
Megastylidinae
Orchids of New Caledonia